Jorge Fernández Valcárcel (born 4 May 1989) is a Spanish male volleyball player. He was part of the Spain men's national volleyball team at the 2010 FIVB Volleyball Men's World Championship in Italy. He plays for Ca'n Ventura Palma.

References

1989 births
Living people
Spanish men's volleyball players
Sportspeople from Ourense
Spanish expatriate sportspeople in France
Expatriate volleyball players in France
Paris Volley players
Competitors at the 2018 Mediterranean Games
Mediterranean Games silver medalists for Spain
Mediterranean Games medalists in volleyball
Sportspeople from Galicia (Spain)
21st-century Spanish people